Dambae is a district (srok)  of Tboung Khmum Province, Cambodia.
The district capital is Dambae town. This small town is located just off National Road 73 about 11 kilometres from National Highway 7. Dambae is around 45 kilometres west of the provincial capital of Kampong Cham Province, Kampong Cham, and 47 kilometres south of the city of Kratié, the capital of Kratié Province.

Dambaer district is home to the Haung resort and waterfall, a picnic and holiday spot. The falls are located in Srae Veng Village, Teuk Chrov Commune near the border with Memot district and about 90 kilometres from the provincial capital. Haung is set in mountain scenery including 1,800 hectares of natural forest. The waterfalls have worn out a 1,425 square metre stone crater below the cascade.

Location 
Dambaer district is in north-central Tboung Khmum Province and borders on one other province. Reading from the north clockwise, Dambae shares a border with Preaek Prasab District of Kratie Province to the north and Memot District forms the eastern boundary. To the south of Dambaer is Ponhea Kraek District. Dambae shares its western border with Tboung Kmum and Krouch Chhmar districts.

Administration 
Formerly part of the Kampong Cham Province, Dambae is one of six districts that were split off to form the new province of Tboung Khmum on 31 December 2013. The Dambae district governor reports to the governor of Tboung Khmum. The following table shows the villages of Dambae district by commune.

Demographics 
Dambae district is subdivided into 7 communes (khum) and 63 villages (phum). According to the 1998 Census, the population of the district was 51,650 persons in 9,738 households in 1998. With a population of over 50,000 people, Dambae is one of the least populated districts in Tboung Khmum province and has the lowest population density. The average household size in Dambae is 5.2 persons per household, slightly higher than the rural average for Cambodia (5.1). The sex ratio in the district is 95.5%, with more females than males.

References

External links
The former Kampong Cham at Royal Government of Cambodia website
The former Kampong Cham at Ministry of Commerce website

Districts of Tboung Khmum province